Maolíosa McHugh  is a Sinn Féin politician from County Tyrone, Northern Ireland who has served as Member of the Legislative Assembly for the West Tyrone constituency in the Northern Ireland Assembly since 28 May 2019. Previously, he was a local councillor and Mayor of Derry and Strabane.

Early life

McHugh was born in Mournebeg, a rural area west of Castlederg, County Tyrone. He worked as a lecturer in the North West Regional College (previously the North West Institute of Further and Higher Education) for almost 33 years.

History
McHugh first elected to Strabane District Council in 2011; he continued as member of Derry City and Strabane District Council when they were merged, and he served as Mayor of Derry and Strabane in 2017–18. During his term, he was criticised for refusing to meet Prince Charles or send a council representative to a Buckingham Palace garden party. He lost his seat in the 2019 local election.

McHugh was coopted onto the Northern Ireland Assembly in May 2019. Órfhlaith Begley MP described McHugh as "A true republican with a wealth of knowledge and experience."

References

External links

Official page

Living people
Sinn Féin MLAs
Northern Ireland MLAs 2017–2022
Politicians from County Tyrone
Mayors of Derry
Members of Strabane District Council
Sinn Féin councillors in Northern Ireland
Year of birth missing (living people)
Northern Ireland MLAs 2022–2027